Jennifer Aspen (born October 9, 1973) is an American actress, best known for her roles as Daphne Jablonsky in Fox teen drama series Party of Five (1998–2000), as Trina Hamilton in ABC family sitcom Rodney (2004–2006), as Kendra Giardi in the first season of the Fox musical comedy series Glee and as Sharon Peacham on ABC comedy-drama GCB (2012).

Career
Aspen made her debut in 1995, and later began playing guest-starring roles in number of television shows, like Hope and Gloria, Beverly Hills, 90210 and Married... with Children. In 1996 she made her film debut with a co-starring role in the family comedy A Very Brady Sequel and  horror film Sometimes They Come Back... Again. She also guest-starred in Will & Grace, Friends, Grey's Anatomy, Shark, Boston Legal, The Closer, Criminal Minds, Supernatural, CSI: Crime Scene Investigation and Private Practice.

Aspen had series regular role in the Fox teen drama series Party of Five from 1998 to 2000. In 2001, she starred in the short-lived sitcom Bob Patterson.  From 2004 to 2006, she starred in the ABC sitcom Rodney opposite Rodney Carrington. The series was canceled after two seasons. In 2009, she appeared in a recurring role of Fox comedy series Glee, as Kendra Giardi.

In 2011, Aspen was cast as one of leads in ABC comedy series GCB. she starred in show as Sharon Peacham, a former beauty queen who was the envy of all the guys and girls in high school on the, with Leslie Bibb, Kristin Chenoweth, Annie Potts, Miriam Shor and Marisol Nichols. She also appeared in Kristin Chenoweth's music video for I Want Somebody (Bitch About). The series debuted on ABC in mid-season, on March 4, 2012, and was cancelled after single season. She later starred as lead in the independent comedy Nowhere Girl, and appeared in 2013 Lifetime movie, The Wrong Woman.

In 2018, Aspen was cast opposite Amy Adams in the HBO eight-episode miniseries Sharp Objects. Also that year, she was cast as a series regular opposite Annie Ilonzeh in the ABC drama pilot Staties.

Personal life
Aspen was born in Richmond, Virginia, and resides in Los Angeles. She graduated from Santa Cruz Highschool class of 1988. She attended the UCLA School of Theater, Film and Television, where she received a BA in Theater. She then studied acting at the Beverly Hills Playhouse. Aspen married her longtime boyfriend of nine years, David O'Donnell, on September 3, 2006.  She is a practicing Scientologist. Her adopted baby girl, Charlotte Sofia O'Donnell, was born June 10, 2012.

Filmography

Film

Television

References

External links

American film actresses
American television actresses
American women comedians
American Scientologists
Actresses from Richmond, Virginia
UCLA Film School alumni
1973 births
Living people
20th-century American actresses
21st-century American actresses
21st-century American comedians